The Harlem Blues and Jazz Band is a  jazz ensemble active since the 1970s.

The band was initiated by Al Vollmer in 1973, noting that a significant pool of jazz musicians who had played in the 1920s and 1930s lived in New York City and had retired as musicians. Its first bandleader was Clyde Bernhardt, who was replaced in 1980 by Bobby Williams. The band is touring in the US and in Europe since 1976 and has edited several LPs and CDs. The band hosted its 40th Anniversary Celebration on April 19, 2013 in New York.

Members
 Doc Cheatham – trumpet
 Willie Singleton – trumpet
 Francis Williams – trumpet
 Art Baron – trombone
 Eddie Durham – trombone
 Roy Williams – trombone
 Barbara Dreiwitz – tuba
 Johnny Williams – tuba
 Happy Caldwell – clarinet
 Ray Blue – saxophone
 Bubba Brooks – saxophone
 Eddie Chamblee – saxophone
 Charles Frazier – saxophone
 Charlie Holmes – saxophone
 George James – saxophone
 George Kelly – saxophone
 Fred Staton – saxophone
 Reuben Jay Cole – piano
 Dill Jones – piano
 Reynold Mullins – piano
 Ram Ramirez – piano
 Gene Rodgers – piano
 Peck Morrison – bass
 Al Casey – guitar
 Fred Wurtzel – guitar
 Jackie Williams – drums
 Tommy Benford – drums
 Johnny Blowers – drums
 Ronnie Cole – drums
 Belton Evans – drums
 Shelton Gary – drums
 Viola Wells – vocals
 Princess White – vocals

References
Mike Hazeldine, "Harlem Blues and Jazz Band". The New Grove Dictionary of Jazz, ed. Barry Kernfeld, 1991, p. 483.

Notes

American jazz ensembles from New York City
Musical groups from New York (state)